The 2017 Washington Huskies football team represented the University of Washington during the 2017 NCAA Division I FBS football season. Chris Petersen led the team in his fourth season as head coach. Washington competed as a member of the North Division of the Pac-12 Conference and played their home games on campus at Husky Stadium in Seattle. They finished the season 10–3, 7–2 in Pac-12 play to win a share of the North Division title with Stanford. Due to their head-to-head loss to Stanford, they did not represent the North Division in the Pac-12 Championship Game. They were invited to the Fiesta Bowl where they lost to Penn State.

Personnel

Coaching staff

Roster

Recruiting

Position key

Recruits

The Huskies signed a total of 18 commits.

Schedule

Source:

Rankings

Game summaries

at Rutgers

Montana

Fresno State

at Colorado

at Oregon State

California

at Arizona State

UCLA

Oregon

at Stanford

Utah

Washington State

vs Penn State (Fiesta Bowl)

Awards and honors

Coaches
Pete Kwiatkowski – Defensive coordinator
Broyles Award : Semi-Finalist

Offense
Dante Pettis – Wide receiver – Senior
Paul Hornung Award (most versatile player) : Finalist

Special teams
Dante Pettis – Return specialist – Senior
Jet Award (top return specialist) : Winner

All-Pac-12 Individual Awards
Vita Vea – Defensive tackle –  Junior
Pat Tillman Defensive Player of the Year
Morris Trophy

Pac-12 All-Conference Team
First Team
Dante Pettis – Wide receiver/Return specialist – Senior
Kaleb McGary – Offensive tackle –  Junior
Coleman Shelton – Center –  Senior
Vita Vea – Defensive tackle –  Junior
Taylor Rapp – Safety – Sophomore

Second Team
Myles Gaskin – Running back – Junior
Will Dissly – Tight end – Senior
Greg Gaines – Defensive tackle –  Junior
Keishawn Bierria – Linebacker –  Senior
Ben Burr-Kirven – Linebacker – Junior
Jojo McIntosh – Safety –  Junior

Honorable Mention
Salvon Ahmed – Running back – Freshman
Tevis Bartlett – Linebacker – Junior
Jake Browning – Quarterback – Junior
Myles Bryant – Cornerback – Sophomore
Nick Harris – Guard – Sophomore

NFL Scouting Combine

Seven members of the 2017 team were invited to participate in drills at the 2018 NFL Scouting Combine held between February 27 and March 5, 2018 at Lucas Oil Stadium in Indianapolis, Indiana.

 Top position performer

NFL Draft
The 2018 NFL Draft was held at AT&T Stadium in Arlington, Texas on April 26 through April 28, 2018. The following Washington players were either selected or signed as undrafted free agents following the draft.

Notes 
1.Due to injury, Dante Pettis did not participate in combine drills.

References

Washington
Washington Huskies football seasons
Washington Huskies football
Washington Huskies football